Mapsidius is a genus of gelechioid moths, which is mostly placed in the flower moth family, which is sometimes included as a subfamily in the Xyloryctidae, or together with these merged into the Oecophoridae. The genus is known only from the Hawaiian Islands.

The caterpillars of these moths feed within webs on the new apical foliage. Later, when the leaves are fully expanded they are sometimes very ragged from the work of these larvae. The white, densely spun cocoons are made on the leaves.

Species
 Mapsidius auspicata Walsingham, 1907
 Mapsidius charpentierii Swezey, 1932
 Mapsidius chenopodii Swezey, 1947
 Mapsidius iridescens Walsingham, 1907
 Mapsidius quadridentata Walsingham, 1907

References

Scythrididae
Endemic moths of Hawaii
Moth genera